Butt's Way is a cricket ground between the villages of Aston Rowant and Kingston Blount in Oxfordshire.

History
The cricket ground was established in 1880 on land on Aston Moors lent by a T. Taylor. Having been used in club cricket by Aston Rowant Cricket Club for over a century, the ground hosted its first minor counties fixture for Oxfordshire in the 1987 Minor Counties Championship against Buckinghamshire. Oxfordshire later played two List A one-day matches there against first-class opponents Somerset in the 1994 NatWest Trophy and Lancashire in the 1996 NatWest Trophy. Oxfordshire played minor counties cricket there until 1999, after which followed a hiatus of seven years before they returned. Up until , Oxfordshire have played seven Minor Counties Championship and six NCCA Knockout Trophy matches at the ground. In 2011, the ground played host to a Women's One Day International between India women and New Zealand women.

Records

List A
Highest team total: 349 for 4 (60 overs) by Somerset v Oxfordshire, 1994
Lowest team total: 130 all out (43 overs) by Oxfordshire v Somerset, as above
Highest individual innings: 116 by Marcus Trescothick for Somerset v Oxfordshire, as above
Best bowling in an innings: 5-22 by Andre van Troost for Somerset v Oxfordshire, as above

See also
List of Oxfordshire County Cricket Club grounds

References

External links
Butt's Way at ESPNCricinfo

Cricket grounds in Oxfordshire
Sports venues completed in 1880
Oxfordshire County Cricket Club